This article shows all participating team squads at the 2009 Women's European Volleyball Championship, held in the Poland from 25 September to 4 October 2009.

Pool A

Head Coach: Miroslav Aksentijević

Head Coach: Avital Selinger

Head Coach: Jerzy Matlak

Head Coach: Gido Vermeulen

Pool B

Head Coach: Fabrice Vial

Head Coach: Giovanni Guidetti

Head Coach: Massimo Barbolini

Head Coach: Alessandro Chiappini

Pool C

Head Coach: Nikolay Karpol

Head Coach: Gert Vande Broek

Head Coach: Dragan Nešić

Head Coach: Vladimir Kuzyutkin

Pool D

Head Coach: Faig Garaev

Head Coach: Táňa Krempaská

Head Coach: Zoran Terzić

Head Coach: Miroslav Čada

Source: Slovenská Volejbalová Federácia (SVF)

References

E
Women's European Volleyball Championships
European Volleyball Championships